Yendegaia Airport ,  is a rural airstrip in the Magallanes Region of Chile. The nearest town is Ushuaia,  to the east in Argentina.

There is nearby mountainous terrain in all quadrants except southeast, over the bay. The river is less than  past either end of the runway.

See also

Transport in Chile
List of airports in Chile

References

External links
OpenStreetMap - Yendegaia
OurAirports - Yendegaia
SkyVector - Navarino-Yendegaia
FallingRain - Yendegaia Airport

Airports in Chile
Airports in Tierra del Fuego Province, Chile